Christian Bechdel II House is a historic home located at Liberty Township, Centre County, Pennsylvania. The front facade features a Palladian window in the central bay of the second story. It has a medium pitch, gable roof and a center hall plan interior.

It was added to the National Register of Historic Places in 1982.

References

Houses on the National Register of Historic Places in Pennsylvania
Georgian architecture in Pennsylvania
Houses completed in 1831
Houses in Centre County, Pennsylvania
National Register of Historic Places in Centre County, Pennsylvania